Hagimoto (written: 萩本) is a Japanese surname. Notable people with the surname include:

, Japanese comedian
, Japanese rugby union player and coach

Japanese-language surnames